Helene Lange (9 April 1848 in Oldenburg – 13 May 1930 in Berlin) was a pedagogue and feminist. She is a symbolic figure of the international and German civil rights feminist movement. In the years from 1919 to 1921 she was a member of the Hamburg Parliament. In 1928 she was honoured with the Grand Prussian State Medal (großen preußischen Staatsmedaille) "For Services to the State".

Life, education and pedagogy

Helene Lange came from a middle class family in Oldenburg. Her parents were the merchant Carl Theodor Lange and his wife Johanne (born tom Dieck). When she was six years old, her mother died from tuberculosis in 1855, and in 1864 her father died from a stroke, where for one year she came under the legal guardianship of a South-German clergy house. In 1866, when Lange's wish to pursue teacher training was narrowed by her legal guardian's, she took an au pair placement at a boarding school in Petit Château, Alsace, where she gave lessons in German literature and grammar and thus was able to participate in teaching courses. She also began an intensive self-study in Philosophy, history of Literature and Religion, historical science and the ancient languages. In 1867, Lange received a placement as governess in the private household of an industrialist-family in Osnabrück.

In 1871, Lange moved to Berlin to prepare for her teacher exam, which she passed. Soon after in 1872, she worked as a private tutor, and immediately committed herself to the emancipation of women and girls through education; and entered the Verein deutscher Lehrerinnen und Erzieherinnen (Association of German Women Teachers and Tutors). From 1874, Lange taught languages at the Krahmerschen Höheren Mädchenschule (Krahmerschen Girls High School) in Lichtenberg near Berlin. Between 1876 and 1891 she was active as teacher and director of the seminar class at the Crainschen Höheren Mädchenschule (Crainschen Girls High School), a private Women's College in Berlin, where she also established a seminar for women teachers.

Political engagement and feminist movement

In 1887, Lange addressed with other women a petition to the Prussian Ministry of Education and the Prussian House of Representatives, that a greater influence of women teachers in public high schools for girls and scientific teacher training for women should be stipulated. The petition was rejected. In the so-called Gelben Broschüre (Yellow Pamphlet), a companion magazine to this petition, Lange summarizes their stance on women's education 'Your goal is the teaching of girls through women, who can better empathize with the essence of girls in their view. To date, most teaching arrangements are held by men'.

In 1889, Lange offered Realkurse (middle high-school courses) for women in Berlin, which were converted in 1893 to Gymnasialkurse (high school courses). In 1890, she established the Allgemeinen Deutschen Lehrerinnenverein (General German Women Teachers Association) to represent the interests of female instructors, and takes management of the association. Lange established the magazine Die Frau (The Woman) in 1893, which developed into the most important magazine of the German women's civil rights movement, and from 1893 Lange is on the founding board of the Allgemeinen Deutschen Frauenvereins, the General German Women's Association. In 1894, Lange became board member of the newly founded Bund Deutscher Frauenvereine (Federation of German Women's Associations), the umbrella organization of all German women's associations. However, the Social Democratic women's groups refused to join, because the Federation rejected their sociopolitical demands. From 1898, and due to failing eyesight, Lange lived and worked together with her companion aide the German feminist and politician Gertrud Bäumer.

When the International Council of Women met in Berlin in 1894, Helene Lange gave her speech about the importance of women's suffrage; at the conference, she helped founding the International Woman Suffrage Alliance.

In 1906, Lange was called upon as an advisor to the Prussian Cultural Administration (preußischen Kultusverwaltung), leading in 1908 to the Prussian girls school reform.

After abolition of the Prussian Associations Legislation (Preußischen Vereinsgesetzgebung) in 1908, which had prohibited women from membership in political parties, Lange joined the left-liberal Freisinnigen Vereinigung (Free-minded Union). Between 1914 and 1918 Lange supported during World War I the Nationaler Frauendienst (National Women's Service), which organized women for war support service on the German Fronts of World War I. Between 1917 and 1920, Lange and Bäumer lived together in Hamburg, where Lange founded the Soziale Frauenschule (Social Women's School), and worked as a teacher.

Later life

After obtaining in 1919 the active and passive suffrage for women in Weimar Germany, Lange was elected for the German Democratic Party (DDP) to the Hamburg parliament, where she opened their inaugural meeting as the oldest member.

In 1920, Lange and Bäumer moved back to Berlin and gradually withdrew from her associations work, but remained active as publicist. She received in 1923 an honorary doctorate of political science from the University of Tübingen and 1928 Lange was honoured with the Grand Prussian State Medal (großen preußischen Staatsmedaille) "For Services to the State".

Literature

, in German.
 "Helene Lange". In The Oxford Companion to German Literature. Oxford University Press, 1976, 1986, 1997, 2005.

References

External links
 

1848 births
1930 deaths
People from Oldenburg (city)
Free-minded Union politicians
German Democratic Party politicians
Members of the Hamburg Parliament
People from Oldenburg (state)
German social workers
International Alliance of Women people
German feminists
German suffragists
German women's rights activists
19th-century German people
20th-century German people
20th-century German women